The Șar (also: Noroieni) is a left tributary of the river Egherul Mare in Romania. It flows into the Egherul Mare on the border with Hungary, near the village Pelișor.

References

Rivers of Romania
Rivers of Satu Mare County